Ardon Bess (born 1941) is a Canadian actor best known for appearing in a Heritage Moment television commercial about the 1958 Springhill mining disaster portraying survivor Maurice Ruddick.

Early life and education
Bess was born in Kingstown, St. Vincent and the Grenadines. After completing his secondary school education in St. Vincent, he became a bank teller. Before moving to Canada, Bess was acting in and directing local amateur theatre in Kingstown. He moved to Canada in 1964 and first lived in Oakville, Ontario with his father. He briefly studied architecture at Ryerson Polytechnical Institute in Toronto. Bess was encouraged by a classmate at Ryerson to go to an acting audition which took place after a soccer practice they were both attending. Following that audition, Bess was offered his first professional theatre role as Sakini in a production of The Teahouse of the August Moon. Subsequently, Bess left Ryerson to attend the National Theatre School of Canada.

Career 
He has also appeared in other films and television roles including Trailer Park Boys, How She Move, Take the Lead, The Ladies Man, Kung Fu: The Legend Continues, Prom Night, King of Kensington, and Jewel. He earned a Gemini Award nomination for Best Performance by an Actor in a Featured Supporting Role in a Dramatic Program or Mini-Series for his role in One Heart Broken Into Song.

Filmography

Film

Television

External links
 
 Theatre Museum Canada Legends Library

1941 births
Living people
Place of birth missing (living people)
Black Canadian male actors
Canadian male film actors
Canadian male television actors
Male actors from Toronto
Saint Vincent and the Grenadines emigrants to Canada